Michael Rafter  is an American arranger, musical director, musical supervisor, conductor, and musician best known for his work on Broadway and collaborations with Sutton Foster. He was Musical Director for the 2014 Broadway revival of Violet.

Awards 
Rafter was awarded the 1994 Emmy Award for Outstanding Individual Achievement in Music Direction in the television adaption of the Stage Musical Gypsy.

Personal life
Michael Rafter was married to Tony winner Jeanine Tesori and lives in Manhattan with their child Siena

Credits

Stage
 Broadway
 Violet° Musical Director (2014)
 Everyday Rapture Musical Supervisor (2010)
 Sweet Charity Broadway Revival Additional Music and Vocal Arranger (2005)
 Thoroughly Modern Millie* Conductor, Musical Director (2002-2004)
 Swing! Musical Supervisor, Music Arranger (1999-2001) 
 The Sound of Music Revival Musical Director, Conductor (1998-1999)
 The King and I Revival Musical Director, Conductor (1996-1998)
 The Most Happy Fella Assistant Conductor, Piano (1992)
 Gypsy Revival Assistant Conductor, Piano (1989-1991)

 West End
 Thoroughly Modern Millie°  Musical Director (2003)

 Off Broadway
 Violet° Musical Director, Conductor (1997)
 Merrily We Roll Along Musical Director (1994)
 Theda Barra and the Frontier Rabbi Musical Director (1993)
 Mandrake Musical Director (1984)

 Other Credits
 Thoroughly Modern Millie° Musical Director (2000)
 Thoroughly Modern Millie° Musical Director (1999)

° Denotes Musical composed by his wife Jeanine Tesori

Discography
 An Evening with Sutton Foster: Live at the Café Carlyle (2011)
 Wish (2008)
 Thoroughly Modern Millie Original Cast Recording (2002)

References

External links
  

 
   Listing at Broadway World

Music directors
Broadway music directors
Living people
Year of birth missing (living people)